The Ford Anglia is a small family car that was designed and manufactured by Ford UK. It is related to the Ford Prefect and the later Ford Popular. The Anglia name was applied to various models between 1939 and 1967. In total, 1,594,486 Anglias were produced. It was replaced by the Ford Escort.

Anglia E04A (1939–1948)

The first Ford Anglia model, the E04A, was released on 31 October 1939 as the smallest model in the UK Ford range. It replaced the Ford 7Y and was a facelift of that model. The Anglia was a simple vehicle aimed at the affordable end of the market, with few features. Most were painted Ford black. Styling was typically late-1930s, with an upright radiator. Standard and deluxe models were available, with the latter having better instrumentation, and on prewar models, running boards. Both front and rear suspensions used transverse leaf springs, and the brakes were mechanical.

The two-door Anglia is similar to the longer, four-door, E93A Ford Prefect. A bulge at the back enabled a spare wheel to be removed from its vertical outside stowage on the back of the car and stowed flat on the boot floor, which usefully increased luggage space. The Anglia replaced the 7Y saloon, but the van version of the earlier model continued to be built until 1946, after which some very minor changes sufficed to rename the van the "E04C".

The domestic market engine was the  straight-four side-valve engine familiar to drivers of predecessor models since 1933. The 1172 cc straight-four engine from the Ford Ten was fitted for some export markets, including North America, where imports began for model year 1948; these cars used the slightly more aerodynamic "three-hole" grille from the 1937–38 Ford Ten 7W, prefacing the 1949 E494A facelift. They also had sealed-beam headlights and small, separate parking lights mounted underneath, as well as dual taillights, into which flashing turn signals could be added without adding additional lights. A minor styling change was made in December 1947, with the name "Anglia" now incorporated in the top of the grille surround.

Compulsory driving tests had only recently been introduced in the UK. Most potential buyers would approach the vehicle without the benefit of formal driving tuition. The cars did have synchromesh between second and top gears, but not between first and second, so many would have sought, wherever possible, to avoid moving changes down to first.

Production, hindered by the diversion of Ford's factory to military production during the Second World War, ceased in 1948 after 55,807 had been built. Initial sales in Britain actually began in early 1940. Production was suspended in early 1942, and resumed in mid-1945.

The E04A was also built in Australia from 1940 to 1945 and was produced in tourer and roadster body styles. The former had a rear seat and the latter was a two-seater convertible.

Anglia A54A (Australia: 1946–1948)

The Australian-built Anglia A54A used the chassis and front panels of the British E04A and was offered in four-door saloon, tourer, coupe utility, and panel van body styles. The 8 hp, 933 cc engine was used, and all models featured running boards.

Three different types of radiator grilles were fitted to A54A models. Both the original and the revised E04A grilles were used and a third style, unique to the A54A, was introduced in 1948. This featured a centrally placed vertical chrome strip.

Anglia E494A (1949–1953)

The 1949 model, code E494A, was a makeover of the previous model with a rather more 1940s-style front end, including the sloped, twin-lobed radiator grille. Again, it was a very spartan vehicle and in 1948, it was Britain's lowest-priced four-wheel car. The 10 hp, 1172 cc engine was again available in export markets; this model is called the E493OA.

The test car cost £309 including taxes.

Including all production, 108,878 were built. When production as an Anglia ceased in October 1953, it continued as the extremely basic Ford Popular until 1959.

Anglia A494A (Australia: 1949–1953)

The Australian-built A494A Anglias of the 1949 to 1953 period shared the frontal styling and  wheelbase chassis of their British E494A counterparts, but differed in many other ways, notably in the range of body styles offered. A494As were produced in four-door saloon, two-door tourer, two-door coupe utility, and two-door roadster utility models. All body styles had running boards, and the boot of the Australian saloon was less prominent than that of the British saloon. The 933 cc, 8 hp unit was initially the only engine offered, but the 1172 cc, 10 hp engine became available from 1950.

At the time of its introduction, the A494A Tourer was the cheapest new car on the Australian market.

Anglia 100E (1953–1959)

In 1953, Ford released the 100E, designed by Lacuesta Automotive. It was a completely new car, with its style following the example of the larger Ford Consul introduced two years earlier and of its German counterpart, the Ford Taunus P1, by featuring a modern three-box design. The 100E was available as a two-door Anglia and a four-door Prefect. During this period, the old Anglia was available as the 103E Popular, touted as the cheapest car in the world.

Internally, the individual front seats were trimmed in PVC, hinged to allow access to the rear. The instruments (speedometer, fuel gauge, and ammeter) were placed in a cluster around the steering column, and the gear change was floor-mounted. A heater and radio were optional extras. The dashboard was revised twice; the binnacle surrounding the steering column was replaced by a central panel with twin dials towards the driver's side in 1956; the last from 1959 had twin dials in a binnacle in front of the driver and 'magic ribbon' AC speedo similar to the 1957 E-series Vauxhall Velox/Cresta and '58/'59 PA models, and included a glovebox.

Under the bonnet, the 100E still housed an antiquated, but actually new,  side-valve engine sharing the bore and stroke of the old unit, but now with larger bearings and inlet valves and pump-assisted cooling. The three-speed gearbox was retained. Some models were fitted with a semiautomatic "Manumatic" gearbox. A second wind-screen wiper was now included at no extra cost, although the wipers' vacuum-powered operation was also retained; by now, this was seen as seriously old-fashioned and the wipers were notorious for slowing down when driving up steep hills, or coming to a complete rest when trying to overtake. The separate chassis construction of the previous models was replaced by unitary construction and the front suspension used "hydraulic telescopic dampers and coil springs" – now called MacPherson struts, a term that had not yet entered the public lexicon – with antiroll bar and semielliptic leaf springs at the rear. A rare option for 1957 and 1958 was Newtondrive clutchless gearchange. The electrical system became 12-volt.

A facelift of the Anglia 100E was announced in October 1957. This included a new mesh radiator grille, new front lamp surrounds, a larger rear window, larger taillights, and chrome bumpers.

The 100E sold well; by the time production ceased in 1959, 345,841 had rolled off the production line. From 1955, two estate car versions were built, similar to the Thames 300E vans, but fitted with side windows, folding rear seats, and a horizontally split tailgate. This necessitated moving the fuel tank. These were the basic Escort and better appointed Squire, which sported wood trim down the sides. This feature has become a common feature of some Ford estates/station wagons ever since. The basic van variant was badged as a Thames product, as were all Ford commercials following the dropping of the Fordson badge.

The test car cost £511 including taxes.

Anglia 105E (1959–1968)

The fourth Anglia model, the 105E, was introduced in 1959. Its American-influenced styling included a sweeping nose line, muted tailfins, and on deluxe versions, a full-width slanted chrome grille in between prominent "eye" headlamps. Basic Anglias featured a narrower, painted grille. Its smoothly sloped line there looked more like a 1950s Studebaker (or even early Ford Thunderbird) than the more aggressive-looking late-'50s American Fords, possibly because its British designers used wind-tunnel testing and streamlining. Like late-'50s Lincolns and Mercurys (and later the Citroën Ami of France and the Consul Classic), the car sported a backward-slanted rear window (so that it would remain clear in rain, according to contemporary marketing claims). In fact, this look was imported from the 1958 Lincoln Continental, where it had been the accidental result of a design specification for an electrically opening (breezeway) rear window. An estate car joined the saloon in the line-up in September 1961. The instrument panel had a red light for the generator and a green one for the oil pressure.

The new styling was joined by something the smaller Fords had been needing for some time – a new engine – a 997 cc overhead valve (OHV) straight four with an oversquare cylinder bore that became known as the Kent. Acceleration from rest was still sluggish, but it was much improved from earlier cars. Also new for British Fords was a four-speed manual gearbox with synchromesh on the top three forward gears; this was replaced by an all-synchromesh box in September 1962 (on 1198 cc powered cars).  The notoriously feeble vacuum-powered windscreen wipers of earlier Anglias were replaced with more conventional electrically powered ones. The Macpherson-strut independent front suspension used on the 100E was retained.

In October 1962, 24-year-old twins Tony and Michael Brookes and a group of friends took an Anglia 105E fitted with the £13 Ford Performance Kit to Montlhéry Autodrome near Paris and captured six International Class G World Records averaging . The Anglia's strength and durability meant only tyre changes were required.

The car's commercial success has subsequently been overshadowed by the even greater sales achieved by the Ford Cortina. In 1960, when 191,752 Anglias left Ford's Dagenham plant in the 105E's first full production year, it set a new production-volume record for Ford of Britain. From October 1963, production continued at Ford's new Halewood plant at Merseyside alongside the newly introduced Corsair models. The Anglia Super introduced in September 1962 for the 1963 model year shared the longer-stroke 1198 cc version of the Ford Kent 997 cc engine of the newly introduced Ford Cortina. The Anglia Super was distinguished by its painted contrasting-coloured side stripe.

The test car cost £610 including taxes of £180.

The old 100E Anglia became the new 100E Popular and the four-door Prefect bodyshell remained available as the new Ford Prefect (107E), which had all 105E running gear, including engine and brakes, while the 100E Escort and Squire remained available, unchanged. In 1961, the Escort and Squire were replaced by the 105E Anglia estate. The 100E delivery van also gave way to a new vehicle based on the 105E.

In South Africa, the Anglia's popularity came late. Sales really took off in early 1966, with the local introduction of the Anglia Super, and 1967 was the car's best year, with a ninth place in overall automobile registrations. Production actually continued longer in South Africa than anywhere else; it was built alongside the Escort from remaining stock until at least the end of 1968.

105E-based Thames and Anglia Vans

Anglia 105E-based Thames 307E 5- and 7-cwt vans released in 1961 were fitted with the 997 cc engine from the Anglia 105E. Although they shared front body panels with the Anglia saloon, the vans were structurally quite different, with a taller windscreen and differently shaped passenger doors, which curved up to the rear along their bottom edges to avoid damage from kerbing. Left-hand drive export versions were designated Thames 308E. The Anglia name was used for certain export markets.

From October 1962, the 5- and 7-cwt vans were also offered with the 1198 cc engine from the Ford Anglia Super and these were designated Thames 309E. Left hand drive export versions were designated Thames 310E.

In March 1965, the use of the Thames name was discontinued, and from that time, all Anglia-based vans were marketed as Ford Anglias. Production ended in November 1967 with a total of 205,001 vans having been produced.

Anglia Torino 105E (1965–67)

The Anglia Torino 105E was developed by the Italian subsidiary of Ford, using the chassis and mechanical components of the 105E Saloon, with new body panels. The Torino was styled by Giovanni Michelotti and built in Turin by Officine Stampaggi Industriali; 10,007 examples were sold in Italy. The model was also marketed in Belgium, the Netherlands, and Luxembourg.

Anglia Super 123E (1962–67)

From 1962, the 123E Anglia Super was available alongside the 105E, replacing the last of the line of Prefects, with a larger 1198 cc engine and other refinements.

The same car was also sold in Europe. One Europe-only variant was the Anglia Sportsman, which carried its spare tyre on the back, somewhat similar to the continental kit often seen in the United States. Chrome bumper overriders, broad whitewall tyres and optionally a side stripe kicking up at the end into the taillights/fin were also fitted. The Super only arrived in South Africa in 1966, although it did boost sales considerably.  Towards the end of the run, Ford experimented with two colours of metallic paint on the Anglia, "Blue Mink" and "Venetian Gold"; 250 were made in the blue and 500 were made in the gold.

Anglia saloons were provided with various levels of trim. The base model was the Standard, and this sported no chromework, painted rear light surrounds, steel-slatted grille, and limited interior trim. The Deluxe had a chrome side strip, chrome rear lights, glovebox lid, sun visor, and full-width chrome radiator grille. The top of the range was the Super, which had twin chrome side strips, contrasting coloured roof and side flash, plusher interior trim, together with the 1198 cc engine and a gearbox with synchromesh on first gear.

Optional extras were the mechanical upgrade of a Deluxe to a Super, retaining the Deluxe trim, or the upgrade of a Deluxe to a Super trim, but retaining the 997 cc engine, an option rarely taken up.

Scale models

Meccano Dinky Toys; No. 155 (production 1961–1964), Anglia 105E deluxe with mostly red interior although a few have appeared with a blue interior, approximately O scale (1:43).
Lesney Products "Matchbox" Series; No. 7b, (production 1961–1966), Anglia 105E with grey or black wheels, windows but no interior, approximately 00 scale.
Lledo Vanguard series; No. unknown (production unknown 1996 - date (later production under Corgi Vanguards 1/43), Anglia 105E, approximately O scale (1:43)
VV model no.1622
Numerous models of a circa 1960 Anglia as portrayed in the Harry Potter series exist. One is the Lego set 4 Privet Drive (#75968).

References

Anglia
Rally cars
Touring cars
Compact cars
Station wagons
Sedans
Police vehicles
Cars introduced in 1939
Cars introduced in 1949
Cars introduced in 1953
Cars introduced in 1959
1960s cars
Anglia
Rear-wheel-drive vehicles
Cars of England